Mamadou Fall (born 31 December 1991) is a Senegalese professional footballer who plays for Süper Lig club Kasımpaşa.

Club career
In September 2018, after not featuring regularly for their senior side, Charleroi loaned Fall to Eupen for the remainder of the 2018–19 Belgian First Division A season.

In January 2022 Fall joined Kasımpaşa in Turkey and signed a two-and-a-half-year contract. He replaced Yusuf Erdogan who moved back to Trabzonspor.

International career
He made his debut for Senegal national football team on 30 March 2021 in a 2021 Africa Cup of Nations qualifier against Eswatini.

References

External links

1991 births
Living people
Senegalese footballers
Senegal international footballers
Association football midfielders
RWS Bruxelles players
R. Charleroi S.C. players
K.A.S. Eupen players
Kasımpaşa S.K. footballers
Belgian Pro League players
Challenger Pro League players
Süper Lig players
Senegalese expatriate footballers
Expatriate footballers in Belgium
Senegalese expatriate sportspeople in Belgium
Expatriate footballers in Turkey
Senegalese expatriate sportspeople in Turkey